Babulal Marandi (born 11 January 1958) is an Indian politician of the Bharatiya Janata Party (BJP). He was the first Chief Minister of Jharkhand and current Leader of the Opposition in the Jharkhand Legislative Assembly. He was the founder and national President of Jharkhand Vikas Morcha (Prajatantrik). He was the Member of Parliament in 12th, 13th 14th and 15th Lok Sabha from Jharkhand. He was the Union State Minister (MoS) for Forests & Environment of India in the BJP – led National Democratic Alliance Government in 1998 to 2000.

Early life 

Babulal was born in a remote Kodia Bandh village under Tisri block of Giridih district of the now Jharkhand province. He belongs to Santal family. After passing high school, he moved to Giridih College from where he did his intermediate and graduation. It was there that he came in contact with the Rashtriya Swayamsevak Sangh.

Later, he moved to Ranchi where he did his post-graduation in Geography from Ranchi University. He worked as a teacher in a village primary school for a year before giving up the job to work for the Sangh Parivar. He served as the organising secretary of the Jharkhand region of Vishva Hindu Parishad.

In 1983, he moved to Dumka and worked in the Santhal Pargana division, which he toured extensively and where he became close to Bishnu Prasad Bhaiya, his then companion and there he used to spend some time at his Jamtara Residence but mainly he used to live in the RSS office in Dumka. And after that his journey to Ranchi and then Delhi began.

Political career

In 1991, the Bharatiya Janata Party gave him the ticket to contest from the Dumka (Lok Sabha constituency), but he lost. In 1996, he lost to Shibu Soren by just 5,000 odd votes. The BJP, in the meantime, made him president of the party's Jharkhand unit.

It was under Marandi's leadership that the party won 12 out of 14 Lok Sabha seats in Jharkhand region in the 1998 election. Marandi, a Santal, led the tally by defeating Jharkhand Mukti Morcha leader Shibu Soren, another Santhal.

The victory gave an immense boost to Marandi's profile and he was included in the Union Council of Ministers, one of four ministers from Bihar.

First NDA rule of Jharkhand

After bifurcation of Bihar in 2000 in states of Bihar and Jharkhand, NDA came to power in Jharkhand with Marandi as the 1st Chief Minister of Jharkhand. Political analysts believe that this government initiated  many developmental schemes in the state, the most visible being, improvement of the road network in the state.

He also put forward the idea to develop Greater Ranchi to reduce the crowding in the city. However, Marandi's tenure proved rather short-lived, as he had to resign and make way for Arjun Munda for the post in 2003 following pressure exerted by coalition allies primarily Janata Dal United.

Thereafter, he increasing moved away from political mainstage of Jharkhand irrespective of NDA being in power in Ranchi. In the 2004 Lok Sabha Elections, he contested from Kodarma Lok Sabha constituency as a BJP candidate. He won the seat while all the other sitting MPs of NDA from Jharkhand including union ministers Yashwant Sinha and Reeta Verma lost their respective seats. His differences with the state leadership continued to increase and he even started criticising the state government in public.

Jharkhand Vikas Morcha (JVM)

Marandi resigned from both the Kodarma seat and the primary membership of the BJP in 2006 and floated a new political outfit named Jharkhand Vikas Morcha. He was followed by 5 MLAs of the BJP. In the subsequent by-elections for the Kodarma seat, he contested as an independent candidate and emerged victoriously.

Marandi, who was the incumbent MP from Kodarma, contested the elections on Jharkhand Vikas Morcha ticket in the 2009 general election, and retained the seat. But in the Narendra Modi wave of 2014, Marandi's party failed to win any seat in the state as BJP won 12 out of 14 seats; from Koderma, BJP's Ravindra Kumar Ray was elected to Lok Sabha.

In February 2020, he merged JVM into BJP.

Bharatiya Janata Party

Marandi merged Jharkhand Vikas Morcha (Prajatantrik) with the BJP on February 17, 2020, at Jagannathpur Maidan, Ranchi in presence of Union Home Minister Amit Shah, BJP president Jagat Prakash Nadda and former Chief Ministers of Jharkhand Arjun Munda and Raghubar Das.

Personal life

Babulal Marandi is married to Shanti Murmu. His younger son Anup Marandi was killed in a Naxal attack at Chilkhari village in Jharkhand's Giridih district on 27 October 2007.

References

External links 
 

1958 births
Living people
Santali people
Chief Ministers of Jharkhand
Chief ministers from Bharatiya Janata Party
Lok Sabha members from Jharkhand
People from Giridih district
People from Koderma district
Bharatiya Janata Party politicians from Jharkhand
Jharkhand Vikas Morcha (Prajatantrik) politicians
Vishva Hindu Parishad members
India MPs 1998–1999
India MPs 1999–2004
India MPs 2004–2009
India MPs 2009–2014
Jharkhand MLAs 2000–2005
Jharkhand MLAs 2019–2024